WPTV-TV (channel 5) is a television station in West Palm Beach, Florida, United States, affiliated with NBC. It is owned by the E. W. Scripps Company alongside Stuart-licensed news-formatted independent station WHDT (channel 9); Scripps also provides certain services to Fox affiliate WFLX (channel 29) under a shared services agreement (SSA) with Gray Television. The stations share studios on South Australian Avenue in downtown West Palm Beach (mailing address says Banyan Boulevard, also known as 1st Street), while WPTV-TV's transmitter is located in Lake Worth along US 441/SR 7.

History
The station began broadcasting on August 22, 1954, as the primary NBC affiliate for all of South Florida with the call letters WJNO-TV. At sign-on, the first words heard on-air were from Control Room Director Vern Crawford: "The power has just been turned on for WJNO-TV channel 5 by Frank M. Folsom, President of The Radio Corporation of America." Crawford later became a fishing reporter for the station. (While the station is the oldest in operation in the region, the area's first TV station was WIRK-TV, Channel 21, which was in operation from 1953 to 1956.)

At that time, it was owned by William Cook and Theodore Granick and there were only 32 employees working at the station. WJNO was later purchased by the Phipps family in 1956 and changed the call letters to WPTV. Then in 1961, Mort Watters, President of Scripps-Howard Broadcasting, purchased the station for Scripps-Howard.

Under new ownership, the station began expanding. WPTV's current  transmitter tower was built along with new transmission facilities. The station's original West Palm Beach studios were expanded. In May 1971, Scripps-Howard built new studio facilities for the station on Flagler Drive in West Palm Beach. During the 1960s and into the early 1970s, WPTV's evening news team of news director and anchor Bill Gordon, sports director and anchor Buck Kinnard, and weather anchor Tony Glenn were number one in the Nielsen ratings. Sometime in the mid-1970s, WPTV adopted the "circle 5" logo that was used for many years by sister station WEWS-TV in Cleveland. In 1976, WPTV began operating the market's first live mobile news van, as well as the first color weather radar. It remained an NBC affiliate throughout the South Florida network switches of January 1989. West Palm Beach is one of the markets that were unaffected by the 1994–96 TV realignment and eventually the ABC/Scripps deal (one of the third, along with KSHB-TV and KJRH-TV) in order to protect WPBF, which agreed to keep the ABC affiliation (WPTV would not have been beneficial to ABC, as WPBF was a UHF station—in contrast, WPTV was a VHF station).

In 1999, it added a new Harris analog transmitter to improve its signal. The station also built a new  transmitter tower. This also gave WPTV a city-grade signal in the northern half of Broward, including Fort Lauderdale. Its signal in most of Broward County was Grade B, not city grade. The upgrade came several years after the NBC owned-and-operated station WTVJ in Miami moved from channel 4 at a transmitter on the Broward and Miami-Dade county line to channel 6 from a transmitter near Homestead.

On March 16, 2001, the station moved from its facilities on Flagler Drive to a larger, newer, and more advanced complex at Banyan Boulevard and 1st Street on the city's west side, approaching Clear Lake. The building's exteriors were used to depict the exteriors of the fictional television station seen during the second season of the NBC sitcom Good Morning, Miami. WPTV's "Circle 5" logo used today is a variation of the one used by WEWS-TV; that station resurrected its version of the logo in January 2007 albeit in a slightly different form from the one used by WPTV.

On March 11, 2011, WPTV entered into a shared services agreement with Raycom Media, then-owner of Fox affiliate WFLX (channel 29). Under the arrangement, WPTV provides technical, promotional, and website operations for WFLX, although Raycom (and now Gray) continues to handle programming responsibilities for that station and conduct all advertising sales. Around June 1, 2011, WFLX moved its operations from its facilities on West Blue Heron Boulevard in Riviera Beach to WPTV's studios. It is unclear if the former will completely vacate its building.

News operation
WPTV broadcasts 44 hours of locally produced newscasts each week (with seven hours each weekday and 4½ hours each on Saturdays and Sundays).

The station has long been the dominant news station in the Gold and Treasure Coasts, regularly beating crosstown rivals WPEC and WPBF in Nielsen ratings. This was in large part due to the presence of Jim Sackett, the station's main anchor from 1978 until his retirement in 2011. Following the May 2009 sweeps period, WPTV retained its title as the most-watched television station in the state of Florida based on sign-on to sign-off household ratings in metered markets. On August 4, 2007, it became the first station in South Florida to air its local newscasts in high definition. The upgrade resulted in the debut of a new graphics package and weather set with advanced HD equipment.

Along with its main studios, the station operates a bureau in the Stuart News building on South Federal Highway/US 1. WPTV also contracts with the Capitol News Service in Tallahassee to maintain two reporters in a bureau near the State Capitol. In addition to NBC News, the station is a CNN affiliate. WPTV operates a one million watt weather radar called "VIPIR 5" at its transmitter site. This is similar to the "CBS 12 StormTrac" system used by WPEC except that the rival gets delayed data from the National Weather Service.

The news department has been recognized with three regional Edward R. Murrow awards in the past seven years. In 2001, the station won for its continuing coverage of the 2000 presidential vote controversy in Palm Beach County. In 2003, WPTV was recognized in the news documentary category for a story on the desperate conditions in Haiti. In April 2008, it was recognized for excellence again in the documentary category for an hour-long primetime special on Medicare fraud produced by its "Contact 5" investigative unit. WPTV is one of many channels that air consumer reports from John Matarese of sister station ABC affiliate WCPO-TV in Cincinnati. The station outsourced its sports department to ESPN Radio affiliate WEFL/760 on January 1, 2010. On January 11, WPTV became the first to air its weekday morning show at 4:30 with the new thirty-minute block known as Today on 5: First at 4:30.

It was announced October 22, 2010, that WFLX would end a news share agreement with Freedom Communications-owned WPEC on December 31. On January 1, 2011, WPTV established a new partnership with WFLX and begin producing a two-hour weekday morning show and nightly hour-long prime time newscasts. These shows originated from a secondary set at WPTV's facilities until July 23, 2021, when WPTV debuted a new set that is now shared with WFLX. The new partnership with WFLX required the addition of more than a dozen new personnel. The station claims that this is the first time a Scripps-owned station has produced news for a station not owned by the company, but this is not true; WXYZ-TV in Detroit produced a 10 p.m. newscast for then-UPN O&O WKBD-TV from 2002 to 2004 after that station (which produced newscasts for WWJ-TV) shut down its news department.

Technical information

Subchannels
The station's digital signal is multiplexed:

WPTV-TV previously carried a 24-hour local weather channel, known as the VIPIR Plus Channel, on WPTV-DT2. Programming consisted of forecasts and live radar. This had been part of NBC Weather Plus from 2004 until 2008. On September 6, 2011, WPTV-DT2 became an affiliate of the Live Well Network; it was replaced by MeTV on April 21, 2014. WPTV re-aired its weekday noon newscast on this channel from 1 to 2 p.m.; this re-broadcast was discontinued when LWN was replaced with MeTV.

Analog-to-digital conversion
WPTV-TV discontinued regular programming on its analog signal, over VHF channel 5, at 5:45 a.m. on June 12, 2009, the official date in which full-power television stations in the United States transitioned from analog to digital broadcasts under federal mandate. The station's digital signal relocated from its pre-transition UHF channel 55, which was among the high band UHF channels (52–69) that were removed from broadcasting use as a result of the transition, to VHF channel 12 (used by WPEC for analog operations). Through the use of PSIP, digital television receivers display the station's virtual channel as its former VHF analog channel 5.

References

External links

WFLX "Fox 29"

PTV-TV
E. W. Scripps Company television stations
NBC network affiliates
MeTV affiliates
Laff (TV network) affiliates
GetTV affiliates
Ion Mystery affiliates
Television channels and stations established in 1954
1954 establishments in Florida